The Kimber Micro is a lightweight, single-action pocket pistol chambered for the .380 ACP cartridge, produced by Kimber Manufacturing. This firearm model was first announced in 2013.

Brief history
In 2014, Kimber introduced the Kimber Micro. This included remove-able grips and mainspring housing, rounded trigger guard, metal ambidextrous safety, drift-able fixed sights, single slot accessory rail, solid aluminum trigger, full length metal guide rod.

Specifications
Chambering: .380 ACP
Weight: 12.90 ounces
Weight with empty magazine: 13.4 ounces 
Trigger Pull: 7.0 pounds
Barrel Length: 2.75 inches  
Overall Height: 4.0 inches 
Overall Length: 5.6 inches 
Grip Width: 1.08 inches 
Magazine Capacity: 7+1, 6+1  
Sights: Black, fixed drift-able. 
Accessory Rail: No

See also
Colt Mustang
Colt Mustang XSP
Kimber Micro 9
SIG Sauer P238
SIG Sauer P938
Springfield Armory 911

References

External links
American Rifleman review
G&A Review
SOF Review

Kimber firearms
.380 ACP semi-automatic pistols